Sutton High School is a public high school located in Sutton, Massachusetts. The school shares its location with Sutton Middle School on a nearly 64-acre campus.

History
According to A History of the Town of Sutton, Massachusetts, written by William Addison Benedict and Hiram Averill Tracy in 1878, Reverend George Anson Willard established Sutton High School in 1835.

Between 2011 and 2015, major renovations took place to the existing school building by the Boston-based architecture firm Flansburgh Architects.

The yearbook of Sutton High is known as the Exitus, and is known to have been published as far back as 1938. The school's student newspaper is known as The Movement.

Athletics
Sutton High School athletic teams are known as the Sammies (boys) and Suzies (girls). The teams compete in District II of the Massachusetts Interscholastic Athletic Association (MIAA), specifically within the Dual Valley Conference (DVC). Competitors include: Blackstone-Millville Regional High School, Douglas High School, Hopedale Junior Senior High School, Nipmuc Regional High School, and Whitinsville Christian School.

The school offers: baseball, basketball, cross country, field hockey, football, golf, soccer, softball, tennis, track and field, and volleyball.

Notable alumni
Ryan Fattman, member of the Massachusetts Senate
David Muradian, member of the Massachusetts House of Representatives

See also
 List of high schools in Massachusetts

References

External links
 Official website
 Official Twitter page

Educational institutions established in 1835
Schools in Worcester County, Massachusetts
Public high schools in Massachusetts
Sutton, Massachusetts